Digama abietis is a moth of the  family Erebidae. It is found in China.

The wingspan is about 29 mm.

External links
 Species info

Aganainae
Moths described in 1889